Liverpool is a lakeside village in Onondaga County, New York, United States. Its population was 2,347 at the 2010 census. The name was adopted from the city of Liverpool in the United Kingdom. The village is on Onondaga Lake, in the western part of the town of Salina and is northwest of Syracuse, of which it is a suburb.

History 

The area was originally inhabited by the Iroquois, starting in the 16th century. In the mid-17th century, Canadian French Jesuits visited the area, setting up missions. These were not permanent, however. An example of these missions is Sainte Marie among the Iroquois, on Onondaga Lake just outside the village. Once the (Erie Canal) and (Oswego Canal) were built, the area was settled by Irish canal workers, Yankee settlers, and, later, German immigrants. The early recorded name for the village was "Little Ireland".

The Lucius Gleason House and Liverpool Cemetery are listed on the National Register of Historic Places.

Erie Canal and salt

Early industries included several salt works in the 19th century and a sawmill. Liverpool played an important role in the salt industry on the shores of Onondaga Lake. A history of the area's salt mining can be found at the Salt Museum.

Village incorporated
The New York State surveyor general laid out the streets in the village and changed its name from "Little Ireland" to Liverpool. The village was incorporated on April 20, 1830. It was named after the city of Liverpool in England. This was probably done because like its eponym, Liverpool, also produced salt, and village leaders wanted to capitalize on the name of another famous salt-producing region.

Industry
The hotel business was booming. George Ingersoll built the Globe Hotel. Liverpool was also a cigar manufacturing center during the 1890s. In 1918, the Oswego Canal was closed. Onondaga Lake Park, established in 1931, is now the location of much of the old canal bed.

Geography
Liverpool is at  (43.105967, -76.209564). It takes up most of the northeastern bank of Onondaga Lake. Onondaga Lake Park is one of the most prominent locales in Liverpool, known for its several trams that travel the length of the park. It attracts over one million visitors each year.

New York State Route 370 is an east–west highway that runs through the village. The New York State Thruway (Interstate 90) passes through the northern part of the village.

Liverpool is also home to a Lockheed Martin factory.

Onondaga Lake Park

Onondaga Lake Park is a county park on the eastern shore of Onondaga Lake outside of Syracuse at 6790 Onondaga Lake Trail in Liverpool. The park is home to the Salt Museum and the East Shore Recreation Trail. Many people living in the area use the Park for exercise.

Notable people
Tim Green, football player, broadcaster, and attorney
Chris Gedney, football player
Adam Fullerton, professional lacrosse player
Chris Madden, retired ice hockey goaltender
Donald R. Miller, New York State assemblyman

Demographics

As of the census of 2000, there were 2,505 people, 1,154 households, and 641 families residing in the village. The population density was 3,321.9 people per square mile (1,289.6/km2). There were 1,219 housing units at an average density of 1,616.5 per square mile (627.5/km2). The racial makeup of the village was 95.93% White, 1.32% African American, 0.20% Native American, 1.28% Asian, 0.36% from other races, and 0.92% from two or more races. Hispanic or Latino of any race were 1.80% of the population.

There were 1,154 households, out of which 24.9% had children under the age of 18 living with them, 41.9% were married couples living together, 11.0% had a female householder with no husband present, and 44.4% were non-families. 36.7% of all households were made up of individuals, and 12.2% had someone living alone who was 65 years of age or older. The average household size was 2.16 and the average family size was 2.86.

In the village, the population was spread out, with 20.6% under the age of 18, 7.1% from 18 to 24, 30.2% from 25 to 44, 25.1% from 45 to 64, and 16.9% who were 65 years of age or older. The median age was 39 years. For every 100 females, there were 84.5 males. For every 100 females age 18 and over, there were 81.3 males.

The median income for a household in the village was $37,581, and the median income for a family was $45,179. Males had a median income of $40,426 versus $25,559 for females. The per capita income for the village was $22,344. About 10.8% of families and 11.6% of the population were below the poverty line, including 20.0% of those under age 18 and 6.1% of those age 65 or over.

References

External links
 Village of Liverpool official website
 
  Rome, Watertown & Ogdensburg Railroad, Liverpool, NY
 Liverpool History, Liverpool Public Library

Villages in New York (state)
Villages in Onondaga County, New York
Syracuse metropolitan area
Onondaga Lake